Penu is a village in Häädemeeste Parish, Pärnu County in southwestern Estonia. It is the sister city to Vagnu, Latvia.

References

 

Villages in Pärnu County